Lüssow may refer to the following places in Mecklenburg-Vorpommern, Germany:

Lüssow, Güstrow, a municipality in the district of Rostock
Lüssow, Nordvorpommern, a municipality in the district Vorpommern-Rügen 
Lüssow (Gützkow), a village in the municipality Gützkow, in the district Vorpommern-Greifswald